"Pero Dile" (English: "But Say It") is a song written and performed by Puerto Rican singer Víctor Manuelle on his sixth studio album, Inconfundible(1999),  and was released as the lead single from the album. It became his eighth number one song on the Tropical Airplay chart and spent 11 weeks at this position. Lyrically, the singers tells his former lover to "go ahead and tell everyone he was a rotten lover and everything was his fault" and admits that "Maybe it was my mistake to love you so much." In spite of giving the album a mixed review, AllMusic critic José A.Estévez, Jr. cited it as one of the songs from "forceful, dynamic singer".  Parry Gettelman praised the song as "graceful as it is catchy, and the lyrics are humorously bitter."  It was nominated "Tropical/Salsa Hot Track of the Year" at the 2000 Latin Billboard Music Awards, but lost to "El Niágara en Bicicleta" by Juan Luis Guerra. In 2000, it was recognized as one of the best-performing songs of the year at the American Society of Composers, Authors and Publishers Awards under the salsa category.

Charts

Weekly charts

Year-end charts

See also
List of Billboard Tropical Airplay number ones of 1999
List of Billboard Tropical Airplay number ones of 2000

References

1999 songs
1999 singles
Víctor Manuelle songs
Song recordings produced by Sergio George
Sony Discos singles